Williamson High School (WHS) was a public high school in Williamson, West Virginia. It closed in June 2011.

History
Williamson High School graduated its first class in 1910. During its existence, the school was housed in three different buildings. Chattaroy High School merged into Williamson in 1963 while Liberty High School merged into WHS in 1966.

On June 7, 2011, Williamson High School was closed and consolidated with Gilbert, Matewan and Burch high schools to form the newly-established Mingo Central High School. MCHS was constructed 25 miles south of Williamson at an elevation of 1,940 feet, on top of a reclaimed surface mining site in Newtown, West Virginia.

Sports
WHS won 13 state titles over its 101-year history.
 Boys' basketball: 1964 (AA), 1983 (AA), 1986 (AA), 1988 (AA), 1989 (AA), 2001 (A)
 Football: 1926, 1944, 1960 (AA), 1961 (AA)
 Baseball: 1948, 1965 (AAA)
 Cheerleading: 1995 (A)

References

Educational institutions established in 1910
Public high schools in West Virginia
Schools in Mingo County, West Virginia
1910 establishments in West Virginia
2011 disestablishments in West Virginia
Educational institutions disestablished in 2011